Ambrosia is the debut album by Ambrosia. It was released in 1975 on 20th Century Fox Records. It spawned the top 20 chart single "Holdin' on to Yesterday" as well as the minor hit "Nice, Nice, Very Nice". The latter sets to music the lyrics to a poem in Kurt Vonnegut's Cat's Cradle. The album was nominated for a Grammy Award for Best Engineered Recording (other than Classical). Alan Parsons was the mixdown engineer for Ambrosia's first album and the producer for their second.

Track listing

Personnel
Ambrosia
David Pack – guitar, lead and backing vocals, keyboards on "Lover Arrive"
Christopher North – keyboards, backing vocals
Joe Puerta – bass, lead and backing vocals
Burleigh Drummond – drums, backing vocals, percussion, bassoon

Additional musicians
Daniel Kobialka – violin
James Newton Howard – synthesizer programming

Production
Producer: Freddie Piro
Engineers: Chuck Johnson, Billy Taylor, Freddie Piro, Tom Trefethen
Mixing: Alan Parsons
Art direction and illustration: Eddie Douglas

Charts
Album

Singles

Notes

References

1975 debut albums
Ambrosia (band) albums
20th Century Fox Records albums